The 2022 Hartlepool Borough Council election took place on 5 May 2022 to elect members of Hartlepool Borough Council. This was on the same day as other local elections. 13 of the 36 seats were up for election, with 1 ward (Rural West) electing 2 councillors.

Background 
Hartlepool is traditionally a Labour council, with Labour forming the majority party for most of its history. The council fell into no overall control from 1976 to 1979, 2000 to 2004, 2008 to 2010, and from 2019 to the present. A coalition of Conservative, Independent Union, and Veterans and People's Party councillors took control of the council in 2019. IU and VPP councillors left their parties to join the Brexit Party in September 2019, but most rejoined their original parties in early 2020.

In the 2021 election, which was under new boundaries, the Conservatives won 13 seats with 25.75%, Labour won 11 with 30.70%, independents won 10 with 25.55%, and the Independent Union won 2 with 6.27%. Separately, the Conservatives won the 2021 Hartlepool by-election on the same day, taking the seat for the first time.

Previous council composition 

Changes:
 May 2021: Jim Lindridge joins Hartlepool People from independent
 February 2022: Brenda Loynes (Conservative) dies; seat left vacant until 2022 election
 Sue Little and Leisa Smith join Putting Seaton First from independent

Results

Results by ward
An asterisk indicates an incumbent councillor.

Burn Valley

De Bruce

Fens & Greatham

Foggy Furze

Hart

Headland & Harbour

Manor House

Rossmere

Rural West

Seaton

Throston

Victoria

By-elections

Throston

References

Hartlepool
2020s in County Durham
Hartlepool Borough Council elections